Windows 8, a major release of the Microsoft Windows operating system, was available in four different editions: Windows 8 (Core), Pro, Enterprise, and RT. Only Windows 8 (Core) and Pro were widely available at retailers. The other editions focus on other markets, such as embedded systems or enterprise. All editions except RT support 32-bit IA-32 CPUs and x64 CPUs.

Editions
 
Windows 8 (also sometimes referred to as Windows 8 (Core) to distinguish from the OS itself) is the basic edition of Windows for the IA-32 and x64 architectures. This edition contains features aimed at the home market segment and provides all of the basic new Windows 8 features.
 
Windows 8 Pro is comparable to Windows 7 Professional and Ultimate and is targeted towards enthusiasts and business users; it includes all the features of Windows 8. Additional features include the ability to receive Remote Desktop connections, the ability to participate in a Windows Server domain, Encrypting File System, Hyper-V, and Virtual Hard Disk Booting, Group Policy as well as BitLocker and BitLocker To Go. Windows Media Center functionality is available only for Windows 8 Pro as a separate software package.
 
Windows 8 Enterprise provides all the features in Windows 8 Pro (except the ability to install the Windows Media Center add-on), with additional features to assist with IT organization (see table below). This edition is available to Software Assurance customers, as well as MSDN and Technet Professional subscribers, and was released on 16 August 2012.
 
 Windows RT is only available pre-installed on ARM-based devices such as tablet PCs. It includes touch-optimized desktop versions of the basic set of Office 2013 applications to users—Microsoft Word, Excel, PowerPoint, and OneNote, and supports device encryption capabilities. Several business-focused features such as Group Policy and domain support are not included.

 Software for Windows RT can be either downloaded from Windows Store or sideloaded, although sideloading on Windows RT must first be enabled by purchasing additional licenses through Microsoft volume licensing outlet. Desktop software that run on previous versions of Windows cannot be run on Windows RT as Windows Store apps are based on Windows Runtime API which differs from the traditional apps. According to CNET, these essential differences may raise the question of whether Windows RT is an edition of Windows: in a conversation with Mozilla, Microsoft deputy general counsel David Heiner was reported to have said Windows RT "isn't Windows anymore." Mozilla general counsel, however, dismissed the assertion on the basis that Windows RT has the same user interface, application programming interface and update mechanism.

Unlike Windows Vista and Windows 7, there are no Starter, Home Basic, Home Premium, or Ultimate editions.

Regional restrictions and variations
All mentioned editions have the ability to use language packs, enabling multiple user interface languages. (This functionality was previously available in Ultimate or Enterprise edition of Windows 7 and Windows Vista.) However, in China and other emerging markets, a variation of Windows 8 without this capability, called Windows 8 Single Language, is sold. This edition can be upgraded to Windows 8 Pro. Furthermore, like in Windows Phone 7, OEMs can choose not to support certain display languages either out of the box or available for download. These exact choices depend on the device manufacturer, country of purchase, and the wireless carrier. For example, a cellular-connected Samsung ATIV Smart PC running Windows 8 on AT&T only supports English, Spanish, French, German, Italian, and Korean (the last three are available as optional downloads).

Additional Windows 8 editions specially destined for European markets have the letter "N" (e.g. Windows 8.1 Enterprise N) suffixed to their names and do not include a bundled copy of Windows Media Player. Microsoft was required to create the "N" editions of Windows after the European Commission ruled in 2004 that it needed to provide a copy of Windows without Windows Media Player tied in.

Windows 8.1 with Bing is a reduced-cost SKU of Windows 8.1 for OEMs that was introduced in May 2014. It was introduced as part of an effort to encourage the production of low-cost devices, whilst "driving end-user usage of Microsoft Services such as Bing and OneDrive". It is subsidized by Microsoft's Bing search engine, which is set as the default within Internet Explorer, and cannot be changed to a third-party alternative by the OEM. This restriction does not apply to end-users, who can still change the default search engine freely after installation. It is otherwise identical to the base edition.

Editions for embedded systems 
  Windows Embedded 8 Standard is a componentized edition of Windows 8 for use in specialized devices. It was released on 20 March 2013. As of 2022, it is the only supported edition of Windows 8, it has reached the end of mainstream support on July 10, 2018 and will reach end of extended support on July 11, 2023.
  Windows Embedded 8 Industry is a edition of Windows 8 for use in industrial devices. It was released on 2 April 2013 and is available in Pro, Pro Retail, and Enterprise editions.

Upgrade compatibility
The following in-place upgrade paths are supported from Windows 7. Note that it is only possible to upgrade from an IA-32 variant of Windows 7 to an IA-32 variant of Windows 8; an x64 variant of Windows 7 can only be upgraded to an x64 variant of Windows 8. The retail package entitled Windows 8 Pro Upgrade was restricted to upgrading a computer with licensed Windows XP SP3, Windows Vista or Windows 7. Finally, there is no upgrade path for Windows RT.

In-upgrade is not available for Windows Vista and Windows XP. However, on Windows XP SP3 and Windows Vista RTM, it is possible to perform a clean install while preserving personal files. On Windows Vista SP1, it is possible to perform a clean install but save system settings as well. While Microsoft still refers to the scenarios as "upgrade", the user still need to reinstall all apps, carry out necessary license activation steps and reinstate app settings.

Comparison chart

Notes

References

8

de:Microsoft Windows 8#Editionen